is a Japanese automotive component manufacturer. It is a member of the Toyota Group of companies. Toyota Boshoku Corporation entered the North American market via Toyota Boshoku America (located, inter alia, in Erlanger, Kentucky).

History
Toyoda Boshoku Corporation was founded by inventor Sakichi Toyoda in 1918, as a textile company. In 1942, it merged with its affiliates and became known as the Chuo Spinning Company, which then merged with the Toyota Motor Corporation in 1943.

In 1950, the Minsei Spinning Co., Ltd established itself as a separate entity from Toyota Motor Corporation. Its name was changed back to Toyoda Boshoku Corporation in 1967, and the company entered the automotive components field beginning in 1972.

The merger between Toyoda Boshoku Corporation, ARACO Corporation, and Takanichi Co., Ltd. in October 2004 led to the company Toyota Boshoku as it is today.

Lines of business
Development of automotive interior systems; manufacture and sales of automotive interior products
Manufacture and sales of automotive filters and powertrain components
Manufacture and sales of other automotive components
Production and sales of fabric goods

External links
 

Auto parts suppliers of Japan
Toyota factories
Toyota Group